{{Infobox amusement park
| name = Flamingo Land Resort
| image = 
| caption = 
| location = Kirby Misperton, North Yorkshire
| location2 = England
| location3 = 
| homepage = 
| owner = Flamingo Land Ltd.
| operator =  Flamingo Land Ltd.
| general_manager = Gordon Gibb
| opening_date = 
| closing_date = 
| previous_names = Yorkshire ZooFlamingo Park
| visitors =  895,000 (2021)
| season = Theme ParkMarch – November ZooYear-round The Club March – November Accommodation  Year-roundParkland Golf CourseYear-round The Splash ZoneYear-round| area = 
| rides = 52
| coasters = 10
| water_rides = 2
| slogan = "Wild Animals, Wilder Rides"
| status = open
| coordinates = 
| logo = https://www.google.com/search?client=ms-android-huawei-rev1&sxsrf=ALeKk00PiM5gnB557-o3O2WkSNtE5jlTsQ%3A1598683458772&ei=QvlJX6rTLvHvxgPEso7IBw&q=flamingo+land+&oq=flamingo+land+&gs_lcp=ChNtb2JpbGUtZ3dzLXdpei1zZXJwEAMyBAgjECcyBAgjECcyBAgjECcyBQgAELEDMggIABCxAxCDATIFCAAQsQMyAggAMgIIADoECAAQRzoGCAAQFhAeUKYgWMsjYOolaABwAXgAgAF2iAGYA5IBAzIuMpgBAKABAcABAQ&sclient=mobile-gws-wiz-serp#imgrc=Zqqdaklj6QpaqM
}}Flamingo Land is a theme park, zoo, and resort located in Kirby Misperton, North Yorkshire, England. Opened in 1959, it has been owned and operated by the Gibb family since 1978.

History

Flamingo Land Resort was established in 1959 when a cinema entrepreneur, Edwin Pentland Hick, sold his cinema chain and used the funds to purchase a bankrupt country club to use the land for a zoo.  The site, which occupied nine acres, was initially called The Yorkshire Zoological Gardens. A colony of flamingos were among the first animals to be housed on site.

In 1963, the gardens became home to the UK's first captive bottlenose dolphins – one of whom was given the name Sooty after the children's TV puppet. During the 1960s a small funfair began to be held on the site. In 1965 the company was floated on the London Stock Exchange as Associated Pleasure Parks and, in 1968, the park was renamed to Flamingo Park Zoo.

In 1968, the park purchased a killer whale from an aquarium within Seattle. Flamingo Park became the first within the UK to house a killer whale, who lived alongside the bottlenose dolphins. Cuddles soon became aggressive towards both the dolphins he lived with and the trainers he worked with and was sold to Dudley Zoo in 1971.

In the 1970s, amusement rides had become a permanent fixture of the park along with the zoo, becoming the first site in Europe to combine the attractions in one location.

The park was losing money by 1974 and underwent a major revamp when it was renamed Flamingo Land. More emphasis was placed on the "day out" experience – with fairground rides, a haunted castle, model railway and a jungle cruise raft ride on the lake. Despite a more professional marketing approach that saw regular guest appearances by celebrities and stars of the day (including the racehorse Red Rum), Flamingo Land continued to lose money.

The owners, Scotia Leisure Ltd., sold the site in 1978 to Robert Gibb – himself a former director at Scotia leisure. He put a team in place to develop the complex as a national, rather than local, tourist attraction, including investing in amusement rides. Many staff were made redundant with most re-engaged on seasonal contracts.

In 1995 Robert Gibb died in a car accident. His son Gordon Gibb, only 18 at the time, and his two sisters, Vicky and Melanie, took over the running of the park.

Attractions
Some of the major attractions at Flamingo Land include:
 Sik – Intamin second-generation 'Multi Inversion Coaster', 10-inversion model opening at a reported cost of £18 million for the 2022 season.
 Hero – Suspended Flying Coaster new for 2013 in Metropolis area of the park. The ride was closed on 22 May 2015 when a piece of foot rail came loose and struck riders, but re-opened after a thin safety net was added under the track where it passes over the queue.
 Pterodactyl – A Zamperla Vertical Swing installed in 2012 in the new Dino-Stone Park for the 2013 season.
 Mumbo Jumbo – Opened in Summer 2009, this roller coaster was recognised at the time by the Guinness World Records as having the steepest drop.
 Flip Flop – Suspended over an artificial lake and features two large ship funnels on either side of the station.
 Kumali – Installed 2006, this is a Suspended Looping Coaster made by Vekoma.
 Navigator – Installed 2005, it was the first 'Mega' "Disk 'O'" type of ride ever to be built.
 Velocity –  Constructed in 2005, replacing the Thunder Mountain attraction.  It was built by Vekoma.  The ride was the first booster bike ride in the United Kingdom, and is the tallest and fastest of its type in the world.  It is estimated to have cost around £7 million.
 Cliff Hanger – Opened in 2002, this is the first and tallest S&S Combo Tower in the United Kingdom.

Also on the site is a gym, a leisure centre, a spa, a golf course and a large collection of log cabins and static caravans.

 Pleasure Island 
Flamingo Land also operated sister park Pleasure Island Family Theme Park in Cleethorpes, from its opening on 23 May 1993 until April 2010, when it became independently operated.

On the former site of Cleethorpes Zoo, construction for an amusement park began in the 1990s, managed by RKF Entertainment. During this time RKF went into administration and Robert Gibb purchased the site as a second park to complement Flamingo Land. When his son Gordon Gibb became chief executive of the company, his sister Vicky Gibb and later, his other sister Melanie Wood took responsibility for the Cleethorpes park.

In 2010 Melanie Wood attained her goal of taking ownership of the park herself, separating it from the rest of the family company. Pleasure Island was then operated by Dewarsavile Enterprises Ltd, directed by Wood. This marked the end of the association between Pleasure Island and Flamingo Land. Pleasure Island closed down at the end of the 2016 season.

Animals

General overview
Flamingo Land houses exotic animals, including camels, Brazilian tapirs, zebras, Vicuñas, hippopotamus, giraffes, meerkats, baboons, chimpanzees, lions, rhinoceros, tigers, sea lions, parrots, and peafowl. 
The park takes part in breeding programmes. A mangabey breeding project was featured in the 2006 series of ITV1 show Theme Park.
In 2010 Flamingoland started work on a penguin enclosure.

Affiliations
Flamingo Land is a member of the British and Irish Association of Zoos and Aquariums (BIAZA) and the European Association of Zoos and Aquaria (EAZA), and has connections to other parks in the country:
The park's male lion, lioness and her cubs were originally located at Longleat Safari Park before moving to Flamingo Land to start a new pride.
Chessington World of Adventures was also once the home of one of the park's sea lions, Clive.
In 2017, Flamingo Land took custody of a new black rhino as part of a European breeding project, named 'Baringo'.
In 2019 The Cheetahs are coming to Flamingo Land to start the European Breeding Programme.

African Animals
The park's emphasis is on their collection of African animals, housed in the Lost Kingdom and African Plains. The Lost River Ride was designed to give a safari experience before its final drop, and meanders through Savannah-style grasslands with giraffe, ostrich, zebra, antelope, hippopotamus, rhinoceros, tiger and lion. The Forgotten City Lion Reserve is also located in the middle of the ride.

Holiday village
The park has a large holiday village with static caravans and log cabins, a leisure centre, a swimming pool, and a café.

There is also The Club and Zoo Bar, an entertainment venue which is exclusive for caravan owners and people staying on site overnight. It is a venue capable of holding over 1000 people and boasts a large stage and resident shows as well as light entertainment performed by visiting cabaret acts. There is also a small supermarket for guests to buy their own supplies.

Theme park
In the past, Flamingo Land never contained any themed areas and was very much an amusement park. Since the beginning of the 21st century, the park has developed several themed areas.

 River Side One 
An area known as River Side One opened in 2014. This part of the resort is open to all visitors. This area contains The Club, Pizza Pie Takeaway Shop, the Gourmet Grill, Frog Hopper and Eleven rides and the American Diner. It also is the name of the outside concert stage which is home to their popular Party In The Park events which happen once a month at the park during the summer period. It normally has a famous artist or band headlining the show. When the concerts started they were originally hosted by Ryan Swain and Frank Lamingo.

 Metropolis 
Metropolis contains food outlets such as the Metropolis Bar and Grill, gift shops, cash machines, and pay-to-play game stalls. In 2016, the Mia and Mylo Show moved with the Farewell Show from the Riverside One to the Plaza, along with the new attraction – the Pirates of Zanzibar, an all-day interactive live show stylized as a large pirate ship. This area also features the rides Velocity and Navigator.

 Flamingo 1 
This area is themed on racing and cars, as shown by its centrepiece ride Flamingo 1 Cars, a small go karting track. It also contains Cliff Hanger, the highest drop tower and the only S&S Combo Tower in the UK. There is also the Upper Deck fish and chip restaurant (which also incorporates the children's play area HMS Bouncy), Jolly Sailor2Go, Fortune2Go (a Cantonese takeout hut), Cool Fuel, the Fuel Stop Cafe and Top Gear, all of which are contained in the brand new 'Hub' entertainment complex. This area is the location of the Hero rollercoaster, Fabrizio's Ristorante and Pizzeria and the Vortex ride.

 Splosh! 
This area was introduced for the summer of 2007 and features a water playground with squirting jets and water-dropping palm trees. Flip Flop is a gyro swing over a man made lake with water effects. Splash Battle is a submarine themed ride where ride cars and off ride posts around the ride are equipped with water cannons.

 Dino Stone Park 
Dino Stone Park is a prehistoric dinosaur-themed land which features five rides including the high altitude star flyer ride Pterodactyl and spinning family coaster called Twistosaurus, which opened in 2013.

 Muddy Duck Farm 
Formally known as the 'Little Monsters Den of Mischief', this area is mainly aimed at children, and includes the attractions Little Monster's Wacky Races and Mischief Mansion. This part of the park has been slowly phased out to make way for an area themed around farm animals, such as the Tractor Ride where children 'drive' the tractors around the farm animals' pens, incorporated into the small Children's Planet area.

 Lost Kingdom Reserve 
This area contains such rides as Lost River Ride, Kumali, and Voodoo. When it was built in 2009, Mumbo Jumbo had the steepest drop of any roller coaster in the world, at 112 degrees. This area is circled by the Daktari Express, a double-00 gauge railway that transports visitors around the reserve stylized as an African express train.

 African Plains 
This is an all-animal area containing various animal paddocks and is located in a quiet, secluded area of the zoo. The monorail offers a bird's eye view of the animals, as does the elevated pathway that goes over a small lake to the Penguin Coast.

 Children's Planet 
This children's area was opened in 2011 and combines both play areas and animal enclosures.

Party In The Park
In 2014 a new area in the park called The Riverside One was built. The River Side One area consists of an undercover outdoor stage which has the capacity to hold over 2000 people and consists of an outside cocktail bar called the R-Bar, a pizza shop, gourmet grill, American Diner and amusements. Flamingo Land Resort announced it was to host a brand new event called Party In The Park which was to take place monthly during the high season on the outdoor stage. The shows have become very popular over the recent years, with thousands of visitors and holiday guests enjoying a 3-hour live concert featuring live acts, bands, acrobats, dancers and celebrity guests on stage. Over the recent years it has seen the likes of Tinchy Stryder, Scouting for Girls, Heather Small, Union J, Venga Boys, Calum Scott, Sam Bailey, Peter Andre and many more headline the show. When the shows first started they were originally fronted and presented by local entertainer and presenter Ryan Swain and his puppet Frank Lamingo. After 3 consecutive years of fronting the events Ryan passed over the microphone to Dan Metcalf who currently presents the events. The stage used to host daily farewell show which features acrobats called The Bongo Warriors, live music and dance and special guests and Flamingo Land Resort mascots Mia & Mylo Meerkat, this has now been branded the sailaway show and relocated to the pirate ship stage in plaza square . In 2018 for the first time it held first auditions for Britain's Got Talent.

 Roller coasters 

Thrill rides

Water rides

Other rides and attractions

The zoo
There are more 120 different species of animals in the park, including hippos, camels, meerkats, reptiles, exotic birds, giraffes, lions, tigers, sea lions, baboons, zebras, rare fish, penguins, otters, and many others. New for 2019 are the Cheetahs

ShowsBird Show – exotic birds at the Zoo.Sail away Show – children's show in the Plaza.Sea Lion Show – sea lion show at the Zoo.Pirates of Zanzibar – live action pirate show in the Plaza.

Past rides and attractions

In the media
Theme Park on ITV
Theme Park is an ITV docusoap shown in the Yorkshire and Tyne Tees Regions, following the behind the scenes activities of Flamingo Land. The first series was broadcast in 2001 and a prominent part of the show was the building of the new area The Little Monsters Den of Mischief.
The series in 2004 followed the development of the new water ride, The Lost River, which replaced the previous log flume, Klondike Creek.
2006 saw the third series of the popular ITV1 show, and followed the construction of the park's new coaster, Kumali.

Zoo Vet at Large
The park's animal collection has also been a main feature of Zoo Vet at Large, which follows vet Matt Brash, both at his North Yorkshire surgeries and in his role as head vet at Flamingo Land. There have been multiple series which aired on ITV1 and are often repeated on the digital channel Sky Real Lives.

ChuckleVision
In an episode of ChuckleVision called "Romany Days", The Chuckle Brothers visit Flamingo Land in search of a pair of underpants which they believe to be of great value. The coaster they predominantly ride during the episode appears to be the Crazy Loop.

ITV Weather sponsorship
Flamingo Land took up the sponsorship of ITV Yorkshire weather in June 2007 and ITV Tyne Tees weather in July 2007. The campaign ran until the end of the season. This sponsorship was renewed with both ITV regions in March 2008 at the start of the new season.

Talk Flamingo
Talk Flamingo was a long-running, discussion-based website about the park with news, construction, history, pictures, reviews and multimedia. The site closed at the end of the park's 2009 season.

Udzungwa Forest Project (UFP)
Flamingo Land's wildlife management initiative operates in the villages closest to the Magombera forest with the aim to maintain tropical rainforest in Eastern Tanzania.  The purpose of the project is to provide villagers with a long-term fuel alternative through education and research, therefore reducing firewood collection within the forest, and thus the pressures placed upon the local environment.

(Hull City A.F.C.) & (Middlesbrough's)
It was announced that Flamingo Land would be the new sponsors of the 2015–16 Championship season of football.Flamingopics'''

A flamingo land resort fansite running from 2012 – current. It features over 2500+ photos 50 videos and plenty of information.

Controversy
In 2012, park owner Gordon Gibb appeared in court charged with the assault of a ticket seller outside the entrance of the park.

On 22 May 2015, a teenage girl was injured and had to be taken to hospital when a footrail fell from a car of the Hero roller coaster and cut her head. Another person was treated at the scene. The Health and Safety Executive (HSE) launched an investigation into the incident. Hero reopened in early  June.

References

External links 

 Flamingo Land Park & Resort – main website for the Park and Resort.

Animal theme parks
Amusement parks in England
Flamingo Land
Tourist attractions in North Yorkshire
1959 establishments in England
Buildings and structures in North Yorkshire
Zoos established in 1959
Amusement parks opened in 1959